Sphenarium is a grasshoppers' genus in the family Pyrgomorphidae indigenous to Mexico.  Various species are caught and eaten as chapulines.

Species 
 Sphenarium adelinae, Sanabria-Urbán, Song & Cueva del Castillo, 2017
 Sphenarium borrei, Bolívar, 1884
 Sphenarium crypticum, Sanabria-Urbán, Song & Cueva del Castillo, 2017
 Sphenarium histrio, Gerstaecker, 1884
 Sphenarium infernalis, Sanabria-Urbán, Song & Cueva del Castillo, 2017
 Sphenarium macrophallicum, Kevan & Boyle, 1978
 Sphenarium mexicanum, Saussure, 1859
 Sphenarium minimum, Bruner, 1906
 Sphenarium miztecum, Sanabria-Urbán, Song & Cueva del Castillo, 2017
 Sphenarium occidentalis, Sanabria-Urbán, Song & Cueva del Castillo, 2017
 Sphenarium planum, Bruner, 1906
 Sphenarium purpurascens, Charpentier, 1845
 Sphenarium rugosum, Bruner, 1906
 Sphenarium tarascum, Sanabria-Urbán, Song & Cueva del Castillo, 2017
 Sphenarium totonacum, Sanabria-Urbán, Song & Cueva del Castillo, 2017
 Sphenarium variabile, Kevan & Boyle, 1978
 Sphenarium zapotecum, Sanabria-Urbán, Song & Cueva del Castillo, 2017

References

External links 

Caelifera genera
Taxa named by Toussaint de Charpentier